Socialist realism was a political doctrine enforced in Poland by the Soviet-sponsored communists government soon after the end of World War II and the Soviet takeover of the country. It was a considerably short period in the history of Polish literature marked by public fear caused by the gross abuses of power by state security forces. The policy was introduced during the Polish Writers Association's 4th Congress, which took place in Szczecin from 20th to 22 January 1949.  From this point until the end of Stalinism in the People's Republic, Socialist realism was an official cultural policy of the country. Writers and poets created works glorifying Joseph Stalin, the Communist doctrine, and the Polish United Workers' Party. Following Stalin's death, there were some critical opinions expressed about such literature, but Socialist realism was still being practised until the 1956 Polish October, when the policy was finally abandoned.

Authors
During Stalinism there were no independent publishers or newspapers. Writers and poets had to write books compatible with the official doctrine or they were denied publication. There were some authors like Zbigniew Herbert who didn't want to glorify communism, so they were absent from cultural life. Others were blacklisted. But most of writers and poets obeyed the government's new cultural policies and were willing to describe the People's Republic of Poland as a land of happiness and freedom living under the benign dispensations of the Communist Party.

There were two generations of authors. The first consisted of writers who had already made names for themselves before World War II, publishing books in the interwar period or during the war. Some of them were fascinated by the new order, and genuinely believed that communism would help the workers, the farmers and the poor. Because of that they joined the Polish United Workers' Party and became political activists like Leon Kruczkowski (playwright) who became a Member of Parliament, or the poet Julian Przyboś - who entered diplomatic service and was posted to Switzerland. Those writers who cooperated with the government wielded a strong influence over the entirety of cultural life in Poland. One writer and publicist, Jerzy Putrament, was made a member of the Central Committee of the Polish United Workers' Party in recognition of  his loyalty to the communist cause.

The second generation of writers was known as The Spotty-Faced (the origin of the nickname is a matter of dispute, with sources variously attributing its coinage to Julian Przyboś, Jan Kott or Zofia Nałkowska). Those were young authors convinced that communism was a fair social system who made their debuts believing that as writers and poets they should make all the people believe in the ideas of Karl Marx and Vladimir Lenin. Some of them, like Wiktor Woroszylski, Andrzej Braun and Witold Wirpsza, dominated literature and had a strong political impact locally, provoking a degree of anxiety in other writers because of their zeal and self-confidence. The Spotty-Faced lost their influence after the Polish Thaw, and many slipped into literary oblivion.

There was also a small group of writers which included famous authors and emerging names who refused to write socialist realistic novels, and chose to remain silent. They published their books after the end of Bierut's era. Zbigniew Herbert and Miron Białoszewski debuted in 1955, Jerzy Zawieyski, a Catholic writer and playwright (debuted in 1921) was denied publication. Such contrarian voices were often connected to the Catholic magazine Tygodnik Powszechny.

Factory literature
Socialist realist writers aimed to portray ordinary people and their daily life. The plot of a typical socialist realist novel or short story was usually set in the workplace, so this kind of book is often referred to as "factory literature" (Polish: produkcyjniaki). Factories, coal mines, construction sites, small towns and villages were typical locations. Some novels depicted major communist construction projects like Nowa Huta: Janina Dziarnowska's Jesteśmy z Nowej Huty (We Are From Nowa Huta) or Początek opowieści (The Beginning of the Story) by Marian Brandys.

The story of the social realist novel is schematic and uncomplicated. The establishing opening often shows a factory ruined by war, operated by disheartened and corrupt staff. The future is shrouded with a sense of gloom. The only upright, positive characters are the local activists from the Polish United Workers' Party, but even they find themselves unable to convince the workers of the advantages of the Six-Year Plan. There is always a positive character who tries to encourage the others to work better and to join the Party. He fails initially because of the machinations of the villain, but as time goes by the rest of the workforce is made to see the light and to embrace the ideas of the Six-Year Plan. The plant begins to prosper, and everyone's personal problems are also solved to arrive at the obligatory happy ending.

A typical positive character wants to be a fine worker, perhaps even an udarnik. He is an idealist, a man of strong communist convictions who makes speeches in political rallies and spends a lot of time reading Marxist literature, especially Krótki kurs historii WKP(b) (A short story of All-Union Communist Party (bolsheviks)) and Stalin's Zagadnienia leninizmu (Questions of leninism). He could be an experienced worker who had long believed in communism, or a young men imbued with fresh enthusiasm for the new times. The protagonist is kind, intelligent, devoted to the Party, and always willing to help. The factory owes every improvement and invention to him. His greatest dream is to play his part in the victory of communism. At the end of a socialist realist novel his efforts find recognition and, if he was a bachelor, he finds a true love.

The antagonist is a political adversary and a member of a hostile social class like the bourgeoisie. Never a mere criminal, he must be an actual enemy of the people. He could be a former (pre-war) police officer, a factory owner or a sanation political operative. In some novels he is a spy from the United States, the United Kingdom, West Germany or France. The villain detests communism and hates the workers; he is typically a nasty, merciless piece of work, prepared to inflict unflinching harm on all around him, like committing acts of sabotage or conspiring against the hero. At the end of the novel  he is unmasked (usually by the hero or by a member of the secret police) and imprisoned.

There are also supporting characters, such as the local leader of the Party. He is often portrayed as a wise, righteous man, mentoring the young hero and acting as his patron. He gives warnings to his young friend about the conspiring enemies, and advises him to be always on guard against the lurking dangers of imperialist forces. Another typical character is an old worker, engineer or craftsman who remembers the pre-war days in Poland. He has no enthusiasm for communism, and even wants Poland to be liberated from the Soviet Union.

Poetry
Poetry was prized for its emotional potential to raise the flagging spirits and stir faith in the revolution. Socialist realist poetry focused on the beauty of the postwar world, the value of work and the general enthusiasm for the government. Socialist realist lyrics were similar to hymns and eulogies, and glorified factories, ships, coal and electricity.

Especially noteworthy was the spate of lyrics on Joseph Stalin and other communist politicians. In Adam Ważyk's poem The River Stalin's wisdom is compared to a great river which circles  the Earth, uniting people all over the world to bring them peace and joy. Władysław Broniewski wrote the lyric A few words about Stalin in which Stalin is described as the driver of "history's train".

In 1955 poet Adam Ważyk (a member of the Polish United Workers' Party and a staunch supporter of Communism) published A Poem for Adults ("Poemat dla dorosłych"), which described postwar Poland in a critical way. Although Ważyk was a voice of Stalinism beforehand, he eventually rejected it, and criticised the results of it in the country, but only at the time of its impending disintegration. Ważyk was strongly criticised for this long poem which appeared in Nowa Kultura, an official publication of the Association of Polish Writers controlled by the Communists. It was a turning point in the wave of literary critiques of the Stalinist regime since 1956.

References

Cultural history of Poland
Polish literature
Poland
Stalinism in Poland
Polish People's Republic
20th-century Polish literature